The Oxford is a historic apartment building located at Indianapolis, Indiana.  It was built in 1902, and is a three-story, six bay by ten bay, orange brick and limestone building.  The entrance features a semi-elliptical rusticated voussoir arch with two Ionic order pilasters.

It was listed on the National Register of Historic Places in 1983.  It is located in the Massachusetts Avenue Commercial District.

References

Individually listed contributing properties to historic districts on the National Register in Indiana
Residential buildings on the National Register of Historic Places in Indiana
Residential buildings completed in 1902
Residential buildings in Indianapolis
National Register of Historic Places in Indianapolis